Kirk Alexander Stackle (born April 16, 1968) is an American former competition swimmer who participated in the 1988 Summer Olympics in Seoul, South Korea.  Stackle competed in the preliminary heats of the men's 200-meter breaststroke, finishing with the nineteenth-best time overall (2:19.47). His wife, Alecha Stackle, played tennis at the University of Texas at Austin. Their daughter, Avery Stackle, now swims for the University of Denver.

See also
 List of University of Texas at Austin alumni
 Mount Carmel High School (San Diego)

References

1968 births
Living people
American male breaststroke swimmers
Olympic swimmers of the United States
Swimmers at the 1988 Summer Olympics
Texas Longhorns men's swimmers
Place of birth missing (living people)